Legislative elections were held in Indonesia on 2 May 1977. They were the third legislative elections since independence, and the second under the New Order regime. There were three participants; the two political parties and functional group Golkar.

Background
In 1971, the New Order regime of Indonesia held the first legislative elections since 1955 in an effort to establish a system of government with President Suharto and the Indonesian military in control and to give this system legitimacy. Thanks to government manipulation of the nine contesting parties and intervention by the government and the military, the government-sponsored Golkar organization won 63 percent of the vote, giving it 227 of the 251 directly elected seats in the DPR as well as all nine indirectly elected seats in Western New Guinea. Golkar was also awarded the remaining 100 seats according to the provisions of the 1969 Election Law, giving it 336, almost three quarters of the total.

President Suharto had long wanted the political parties to be "simplified", and in 1972, he said that this simplification would be complete if there were only three ballot symbols in the next election, a sentiment echoed by Suharto's personal assistant and head of the Special Operations (Opsus) unit Ali Murtopo, who said the 1976 election (as it was then scheduled) would only be contested by three "flags", namely those of the two parties and one functional group. In January 1973, this was realized in the forced fusion of the nine existing political parties into two: the four Islamic parties were combined into the United Development Party (PPP) and the nationalist and Christian parties formed the Indonesian Democratic Party (PDI).

In its 1973 session, the People's Consultative Assembly reelected Suharto president for a five-year term and passed a resolution stating that the election would be held at the latest by the end of 1977 and that there would be three participants, the two political parties and the 'functional group' Golkar. The election was finally scheduled for 1977, the extra year being necessary for the New Order to have enough time to make the necessary changes to laws to ensure its victory.

The government began preparing for the election in 1975 when it sent the necessary legislation for approval to the DPR. There were two bills, one on the party system and one on the organization of the election. They were designed to make it easier for Golkar to defeat the two parties by banning civil servants from joining political parties (i.e. not including Golkar), obliging parties to adopt the state philosophy Pancasila and the 1945 Constitution as their sole ideology and not allowing parties to organize below the level of the district. There was strong opposition to these proposals from both the parties, and this resulted in a compromise on all three, in particular with the PPP being allowed to be based on Islam.

As in 1971, the government screened all election candidates and disqualified 19% from the PPP, 16% from the PDI and 5% from Golkar.

Campaign
The campaign lasted from 24 February to 24 April. The week before the 2 May vote was a "quiet week". During the campaign, there were a total of 203 recorded violations, 103 by the United Development Party, 38 by the Indonesian Democratic Party, 22 by Golkar, 15 by officers and 25 anonymously.

Results
The 100 unelected seats were filled by appointed Golkar representatives, including 75 from ABRI and four from the new province of East Timor, which was "not yet able to hold elections".

Aftermath
The newly elected members of the DPR were sworn in on 1 October 1977.

Notes

References
Notes

Sources
 
 

 
 
 
 
 
 

Legislative elections in Indonesia
Legislative election
New Order (Indonesia)
Indonesia
People's Consultative Assembly
Indonesian legislative election
Election and referendum articles with incomplete results